Caught Plastered is a 1931 American Pre-Code musical comedy film, released by RKO Radio Pictures and starring the comedy team Wheeler & Woolsey.

Plot
Tommy Tanner (Wheeler) and Egbert G. Higginbotham (Woolsey) are two vaudevillians who were kicked out of the last town they performed in. After fleeing to the town of Lockville, the duo befriend elderly widow Mother Talley (Lucy Beaumont). Mother is upset because she is unable to get customers into her drug store. In addition, Mother owes a payment on a bank note to Harry Watters (Jason Robards). Tommy and Egbert decide to turn Mother's drugstore into a money-making venture, even producing their own afternoon radio program right in the store. Harry, who wants to buy the store as part of a bootlegging operation, attempts to sell the duo an alcohol-laced drink, referring to it as "lemon-syrup". The "syrup" gains praise from everybody in town, until the police show up to close down the operation. Tommy and Egbert are suspicious of Harry, and it is up to them to find Harry, clear their name, and save Mother's store.

Cast
Bert Wheeler as Tommy Tanner
Robert Woolsey as Egbert G. Higginbotham
Dorothy Lee as Peggy Morton
Lucy Beaumont as Mother Talley
Jason Robards as Harry Watters
Charles B. Middleton as Sheriff Flint
DeWitt Jennings as Police Chief H.A. Morton
Josephine Whittell as Miss Newton
Jim Farley as Clancy, a policeman
Nora Cecil as Miss Loring (uncredited)
Tom Herbert as Streetcar conductor (uncredited)
Arthur Housman as First Drunk Customer (uncredited)
Lee Moran as Second Drunk Customer (uncredited)
William Scott as Clark (uncredited)

Reception
According to RKO the film made a profit of $90,000.

References

External links
 
 
 

1931 films
1931 musical comedy films
American musical comedy films
RKO Pictures films
American black-and-white films
Films directed by William A. Seiter
1930s American films